Land systems of Western Australia are systematic land resource concepts where the tying in of geographical, geological, and ecological data is processed to provide land planning and land management systems with sets of information that can process large areas of land in terms of agricultural and other usages.

At times land systems are not referred to directly, but used within terms of land resources and landform resources analysis and appraisal.  The government departments from which reports and papers emanate include the Agricultural and Mining departments, as well as Land administration bodies.

 Ashburton River Catchment
 Karridale - Leeuwin
 Wiluna - Meekatharra
In other states and territories of Australia, surveys of the systems have covered a range of subjects related to the issue of management.

Selected land systems 
The reports and research use catchment systems, regions and other land management areas as a baseline.

 Ashburton

 Carnarvon Basin

 Sandstone-Yalgoo-Paynes Find area

In some cases, land system surveys are captured in map form.

 Ashburton
 North east goldfields

Notes

Land systems
Geography of Western Australia